The Newark Unified School District (NUSD) is the public school district for Newark, California, United States. NUSD was formed in 1964. 

As of 2021-22, NUSD consists of the following schools:
 Birch Grove Primary Elementary School (Formerly named James L. Bunker; it was named BGP in 2016.)
 Birch Grove Intermediate Elementary School (Formerly named Louis Milani; it was named BGI in 2016.)
 Coyote Hills Elementary School (Formerly named James A. Graham; it was named Coyote Hills in 2021. It was the result of a merger between Graham Elementary and Snow Elementary; the Snow campus closed in 2021.)
 Kennedy Elementary School
 Lincoln Elementary School
 EL Musick Elementary School & Preschool (the Preschool was formerly located in the Whiteford building on the MacGregor campus)
 Schilling Elementary School
 Newark Junior High School
 Newark Memorial High School

At the NUSD MacGregor Alternative Education Center:
 Bridgepoint High School
 Crossroads Independent School
 Newark Adult Education Center

Former NUSD schools:
 Snow Elementary School (closed in 2021)
 Ruschin Elementary School (NUSD stopped using it as a school in 1989. In 2015, the land was sold to residential developers for housing.)

The NUSD Board of Education is composed of five Newark citizens, elected to serve overlapping terms. They are elected at-large by the registered voters in Newark. The Board functions as the legislative body of the school district and establishes policies by which the school district is operated.

References

External links

Newark, California
School districts in Alameda County, California
1964 establishments in California
School districts established in 1964